Maduro is a surname. Notable people with the name include:

Politicians 
 Conrad Maduro, British Virgin Islands politicians and party leader
 Nicolás Maduro (born 1962), Venezuelan president
 Nicolás Maduro Guerra (born 1990), Venezuelan politician, son of the Venezuelan president
 Ricardo Maduro (born 1946), former President of Honduras and chairman of the Central Bank of Honduras
 Xiomara Maduro (born 1974), Aruban politician and minister

Athletes 
 Calvin Maduro (born 1974), Aruban professional baseball player
 Clayon Maduro (born 1989), Aruban professional footballer
 Hedwiges Maduro (born 1985), Dutch footballer
 Ryan Maduro (born 1986), American professional soccer player

Other 
 George Maduro (1916–1945), Dutch World War II hero

See also
Bobby Maduro Miami Stadium, ballpark of Miami 
Maduro & Curiel's Bank, a bank in Curaçao
Maduro Holding, a conglomerate operating in the Dutch Caribbean